MCF can refer to:

Transport and Manufacturing
 Modern Coach Factory, Raebareli, an Indian rail manufacturer

Science and technology
 Military-Civil Fusion, a Chinese economic strategy for technological dominance developed by Xi Jinping
 Magnetic confinement fusion, an approach for thermonuclear fusion
 Makes caterpillars floppy, a gene in the bacterium Photorhabdus luminescens
 Malignant catarrhal fever (Bovine malignant catarrhal fever), a disease of cattle and related species
 Master Control Facility, ISRO's communication satellite control centre
 Median cell fragility (Erythrocyte fragility), the NaCl concentration at which 50% of cells in a blood sample undergo lysis 
 Methyl chloroform, 1,1,1-trichloroethane
 Mille cubic feet (Mcf), 1000 cubic feet, unit of volume used in natural gas industry
 Modulation contrast function, a variant of the Optical transfer function, used in optical imaging analysis
 Multi-commodity flow problem, a flow network problem with multiple commodities between different source and sink nodes

Culture and entertainment

 Magic Circle Festival, a German heavy metal music festival
 Málaga CF, a football club based in Málaga, Spain
 Real Madrid C.F., a football club based in Madrid, Spain
 Malaysia Chess Federation, organization for chess players in Malaysia

Business and finance

 Mangalore Chemicals & Fertilizers, an Indian fertilizer company
 Marginal cost of funds, an aspect of Excess burden of taxation
 MCF, ISO 4217 code for the Monégasque franc, the former currency of Monaco
 Modern Coach Factory, Raebareli, an Indian rail manufacturer

Computing

 MacCentral Forum (1998-2008), a former on-line forum for Apple Macintosh users
 Meta Content Framework, a discontinued specification of a content format for structuring metadata about web sites
 Modular Crypt Format, a method of storing hashed passwords
 Multimedia Container Format, an unfinished digital media specification which was incorporated into Matroska
 Mystery Case Files, a video game series

Other
 Malaysian Chess Federation, a sport organization in Malaysia
 Marine Commando Force, now MARCOS, the special forces unit of the Indian Navy
 Micro Complement fixation test, a high-sensitivity immunological medical test
 Muskegon Correctional Facility, a state prison in Michigan, United States 
 Michael C. Fina, an American luxury-goods retailer 
 Melamine faced chipboard, a form of Particle board, an engineered wood product
 Municipal Corporation of Faridabad, the city government of Faridabad, India
Maître de conférences, a rank in French academia.
 Mully Children's Family, a nonprofit organization for children in need